The Football Writers Association of America (FWAA) is an organization of college football media members in the United States founded in 1941. It is composed of approximately 1,200 professional sports writers from both print and Internet media outlets. The membership includes journalists, broadcasters and publicists, as well as key executives in all the areas that involve the game.

The FWAA works to govern areas that include game day operations, and strives for better working conditions for sports writers in college football press boxes, and deals with access issues to college athletes and coaches. The FWAA also sponsors scholarships for aspiring writers and an annual writing contest.

The FWAA is one of the organizations whose College Football All-America Team is recognized by the NCAA. The organization also selects the Eddie Robinson Coach of the Year, the Bronko Nagurski Trophy winner, the Outland Trophy winner, a freshman All-America team, and weekly defensive player of the week, as well as developing scholarship programs and surveys for better working conditions. From 1954 to 2013, the association awarded the Grantland Rice Trophy to the college football team they chose to be the National Champion.

All-America Committees
The Football Writers Association of America All-America Committee selects the 25-man All-America Team and the winners of the Bronko Nagurski and Outland trophies. In the spring, the committee selects the FWAA All-America Watch List and the watch lists for both of the FWAA's major player awards. The FWAA has chosen an All-America Team annually since the 1944 season; it is the second longest continuously-published team in major college football.

2009 Committee

John Davis, Oxford (Miss.) Eagle
Heather Dinich, espn.com
Pete DiPrimio, Fort Wayne (Ind.) News-Sentinel
Dennis Dodd, CBSSports.com
Ryan Finley, Arizona Daily Star
Pete Fiutak, College Football News
Kevin Gorman, Pittsburgh Tribune-Review

Anthony Hanshew, The Herald-Dispatch (Huntington, W. Va.)
Dave Matter, Columbia (Mo.) Daily Tribune
Mick McGrane, The San Diego Union-Tribune
Rodney McKissic, The Buffalo News
Adam Sparks, Daily News Journal (Murfreesboro, Tenn.)
Phil Steele, Phil Steele Publications
Jimmy Watson, Shreveport Times

2008 Committee

Bob Asmussen, Champaign News-Gazette
Frank Coyle, draftinsiders.com
Chadd Cripe, Idaho Statesman
Dennis Dodd, CBSSports.com
Joseph Duarte, Houston Chronicle
Antonya English, St. Petersburg Times
Maureen Fulton, Toledo Blade

Bob Holt, Arkansas Democrat-Gazette
Tom Kensler, Denver Post
Lenn Robbins, New York Post
George Schroeder, Eugene Register-Guard
Phil Steele, Phil Steele Publications
Paul Strelow, The State
Phil Stukenborg, The Commercial Appeal

2007 Committee

Mark Blaudschun, Boston Globe
Chip Brown, The Dallas Morning News
Bob Clark, Eugene Register-Guard
Buddy Davis, Ruston Daily Leader
Dennis Dodd, CBSSports.com

Bob Holt, Arkansas Democrat-Gazette
Steve Irvine, Birmingham News
Michael Lewis, Salt Lake Tribune
Matt Markey, Toledo Blade
Brett McMurphy, Tampa Tribune

2006 Committee

Eric Bailey, Tulsa World
Chad Cripe, Idaho Statesman
Scott Ferrell, Shreveport Times
Robert Gagliardi, Wyoming Tribune-Eagle
Eric Hansen, South Bend Tribune

Andrew Logue, Des Moines Register
Tom Luicci, Newark Star-Ledger
Jeff Metcalfe, Arizona Republic
George Schroeder, Daily Oklahoman
Norm Wood, Daily Press

Bert McGrane Award winners
Presented to a member of the FWAA for "outstanding contribution to the organization".

1974 Charley Johnson, Minneapolis Star
1975 Wilfrid Smith, Chicago Tribune
1976 Paul Zimmerman, Los Angeles Times
1977 Dick Cullum, Minneapolis Tribune
1978 Wilbur Evans, Cotton Bowl Athletic Association
1979 Tom Siler, Knoxville News-Sentinel
1980 Maury White, Des Moines Register
1981 Fred Russell, Nashville Banner
1982 Furman Bisher, Atlanta Journal
1983 John Mooney, Salt Lake Tribune
1984 Si Burick, Dayton News
1985 Blackie Sherrod, The Dallas Morning News
1986 Raymond Johnson, Nashville Tennessean
1987 Tim Cohane, Look Magazine
1988 Dave Campbell, Waco Tribune Herald
1989 Jim Brock, Cotton Bowl Athletic Association
1990 Jack Hairston, Gainesville Sun
1991 Murray Olderman, Newspaper Enterprise Association
1992 Volney Meece, The Daily Oklahoman
1993 Bob Hentzen, Topeka Capital Journal
1994 Edgar Allen, Nashville Journal
1995 Dick Herbert, Raleigh News & Observer
1996 Bob Hammel, Bloomington Herald-Times
1997 Bill Lumpkin, Birmingham Post-Herald
1998 Don Bryant, University of Nebraska
1999 Field Scovell, Cotton Bowl Athletic Association
2000 Jimmie McDowell, All-American Football Foundation
2001 Edwin Pope, Miami Herald
2002 Orville Henry, Arkansas Democrat-Gazette
2003 Dan Foster, Greenville News
2004 Pat Harmon, Cincinnati Post
2005 Steve Richardson, FWAA Executive Director
2006 John Junker, Tostitos Fiesta Bowl
2007 Mark Blaudschun, Boston Globe
2008 Claude Felton, University of Georgia
2009 Tony Barnhart, Atlanta Journal-Constitution
2010 Tom Mickle, Florida Citrus Sports
2011 Beano Cook, ESPN/University of Pittsburgh
2012 Dave Sittler, Tulsa World
2013 Dick Weiss, New York Daily News
2014 Tim Tessalone, University of Southern California
2015 Steve Hatchell, National Football Foundation
2016 Ivan Maisel, ESPN.com
2017 Charlie Fiss, Cotton Bowl Athletic Association
2018 Steve Wieberg, USA Today (1982–2012)
2019 Blair Kerkhoff, The Kansas City Star

All-Time Teams
Selected by the Football Writers Association of America for the centennial year of college football in 1969. An Early Era team was chosen that featured Jim Thorpe, a modern team (1919–68) and a Quarter-Century team that was chosen in 1993, 25 years after the college football centennial celebration.

1969–1994 All-America Team

Offense
C – Dave Rimington, Nebraska
G – John Hannah, Alabama
G – Dean Steinkuhler, Nebraska
T – Bill Fralic, Pittsburgh
T – Jerry Sisemore, Texas
TE – Keith Jackson, Oklahoma
WR – Anthony Carter, Michigan
WR – Jerry Rice, Mississippi Valley
QB – John Elway, Stanford
RB – Tony Dorsett, Pittsburgh
RB – Herschel Walker, University of Georgia
K – Tony Franklin, Texas A&M University
KR – Johnny Rodgers, Nebraska

Defense
DE – Lee Roy Selmon, Oklahoma
DE – Jack Youngblood, Florida
DT – Steve Emtman, Washington
DT – Randy White, Maryland
LB – Hugh Green, Pittsburgh
LB – Lawrence Taylor, North Carolina
MLB – Mike Singletary, Baylor
DB – Deion Sanders, Florida State
DB – Ronnie Lott, Southern California
DB – Jack Tatum, Ohio State
DB – Kenny Easley, UCLA
P – Ray Guy – Southern Mississippi

1919–1968 Modern Era All-America Team
E – Bennie Oosterbaan, Michigan 
E – Don Hutson, Alabama
L – Bronko Nagurski, Minnesota
L – Bruiser Kinard, Mississippi
L – Jim Parker, Ohio State
L – Bob Suffridge, Tennessee 
C – Mel Hein, Washington State
B – Sammy Baugh, Texas Christian
B – Jay Berwanger, Chicago
B – Ernie Nevers, Stanford
B – Red Grange, Illinois

1869–1918 Early Era All-America Team
E – Frank Hinkey, Yale 
E – Huntington Hardwick, Harvard
T – Josh Cody, Vanderbilt  
T – Wilbur Henry, Washington and Jefferson
G – Pudge Heffelfinger, Yale
G – Truxtun Hare, Pennsylvania
C – Germany Schulz, Michigan
B – Jim Thorpe, Carlisle
B – Elmer Oliphant, Purdue
B – Willie Heston, Michigan
B – Walter Eckersall, Chicago

Awards sponsored
See footnote
Currently the FWAA sponsors seven awards and those are affiliated with the National College Football Awards Association (NCFAA).
All-America and Freshman All-America Teams
Bronko Nagurski Trophy
Outland Trophy
Grantland Rice Trophy
Eddie Robinson Coach of the Year
FedEx Orange Bowl Courage Award
Tostitos Fiesta Bowl National Team of the Week

Poll

Beginning in 2014, 26 members of the FWAA will vote in a new poll in partnership with the National Football Foundation. It is called the FWAA-NFF Grantland Rice Super 16 Poll.

See also
Pro Football Writers Association
National Collegiate Baseball Writers Association
Baseball Writers' Association of America
United States Basketball Writers Association (college)
Pro Basketball Writers Association
Professional Hockey Writers Association
National Sports Media Association

Notes

External links

College football mass media
American sports journalism organizations
Journalism-related professional associations
Sports organizations established in 1941